Rose Epstein Frisch (July 7, 1918 – January 30, 2015) was a pioneering American scientist in fertility and human development whose work was instrumental in the discovery of leptin. She is mainly known for her work in infertility; specifically the discovery that low body fat was a contributing factor to infertility.

Early life and education
She was born Rose Epstein in 1918, in the Bronx, to Russian-Jewish immigrants Louis and Stella Epstein. Her brother Lee Eastman (born Leopold Vail Epstein) is Linda McCartney's father. Frisch attended Smith College in Northampton, Massachusetts, where she received a Bachelor of Arts in 1939. She earned her master's degree in zoology the following year at Columbia University, and her Ph.D. in genetics from the University of Wisconsin in 1943. She met her husband, David H. Frisch, while she was at Smith and he was at Princeton. The two worked on the atomic bomb project at Los Alamos National Laboratory during the second World War.

Research
Focusing on the role of adipose tissue (fat) in fertility, Frisch discovered that low body fat (under 17%) could cause infertility, late menarche, and oligomenorrhea. This discovery was published in the journal Science in 1974. She also discovered that athletes were at lower risk of breast cancer.

Frisch began her research career as a doctoral student at the University of Wisconsin, where she worked with Drosophila melanogaster. After her doctorate, she became a human computer for the Manhattan Project. Once her children were older, she took a research position at the Harvard Center for Population and Development Studies in Cambridge, Massachusetts. Frisch remained at Harvard for the rest of her career, studying swimmers, dancers, and other athletes to learn how body fat affects fertility and the propensity for diseases such as breast cancer.

Until she passed, she was involved with the Cambridge-based Center for Population and Development Studies of the Harvard T.H. Chan School of Public Health.

Legacy
Frisch was widely respected by athletic women, who were often able to achieve a pregnancy in part by applying knowledge gathered from her research.

Honors and awards
Guggenheim Fellowship – 1975–1976
Sigma Xi national lecturer – 1988–1990
Fellow of the Bunting Institute – 1993–1994
Fellow of the American Academy of Arts and Sciences
Rally Day Medal for Medical Research and Reproductive Health (awarded by Smith College)
Professor Emeritus Award of Merit, Harvard School of Public Health

Selected publications

 

Frisch, Rose E. Plants that Feed the World. (1966).  Van Nostrand; First Edition (1966). ASIN: B0000CNBFC - children’s book on nutrition
Frisch, Rose E. (Ed.). Adipose Tissue and Reproduction (March 1990).  S Karger Publishers. .

See also
 Linda McCartney

References

External links 

Rose E. Frisch Papers, 1921-2014 (inclusive), 1970-2000 (bulk). H MS c455. Harvard Medical Library, Francis A. Countway Library of Medicine, Boston, Mass.

American women biologists
1918 births
2015 deaths
Smith College alumni
Columbia Graduate School of Arts and Sciences alumni
University of Wisconsin–Madison College of Agricultural and Life Sciences alumni
Fellows of the American Academy of Arts and Sciences
Harvard School of Public Health faculty
20th-century American women scientists
American women academics
21st-century American women